UTMB may refer to:

 University of Texas Medical Branch 
 Ultra-Trail du Mont-Blanc, single-stage mountain ultramarathon